State Road 922 (SR 922) is a  east–west road built in 1951, passing through the cities of North Miami, Bay Harbor Islands, and Bal Harbour, Florida. Locally, the street is also known as North 125th Street, North Miami Boulevard, Northeast 123rd Street, Broad Causeway, 96th Street, and Kane Concourse. Its western terminus is an intersection with Northwest Seventh Avenue (US 441/SR 7), one block west of Interstate 95, its eastern terminus is an intersection with SR A1A. The street is an important commercial artery in northeastern Miami-Dade County, with stores lining much of the route, including the Bal Harbour Shops mall near its eastern terminus.

Route description

State Road 922 begins at the intersection between 125th Street and US 441/SR 7, with SR 922 heading east, intersecting with I-95 just one block east of the western terminus. East of I-95, SR 922 continues through mostly residential areas of North Miami, becoming commercial as it reaches the intersection with SR 909/SR 915. East of the intersection, SR 922 continues as a commercial thoroughfare until a railroad crossing jags SR 922 slightly south to become 123rd Street. It then meets with US 1/SR 5, and runs towards Biscayne Bay. Less than a mile east of US 1, State Road 922 crosses Biscayne Bay on the Broad Causeway, a toll causeway (with a drawbridge) maintained and operated by the Town of Bay Harbor Islands. 

The SunPass toll rate for SR922 is $1.75 (US) for a two-axle passenger car and $3.00 via Toll-by-Plate. Additional axles at the SunPass rate are $6.00 per each additional axle and $7.50 for Toll-by-Plate.

East of the Causeway, SR 922 enters Surfside as 96th Street, running through the two Bay Harbor barrier Islands before entering the coastline area, passing by the Bal Harbour Shops before SR 922 terminates at SR A1A. East of this intersection, 96th Street continues for one block to the Atlantic Ocean shoreline.

History
The Broad Causeway opened in 1951, named after Shepard Broad.

Before a 1983 reassignment of Florida Department of Transportation designations, the route had signs indicating that it was State Road 968, its former number was transferred to another east–west street  to the south (Flagler Street).

Major intersections

References

External links

State highways in Florida
State Roads in Miami-Dade County, Florida
Intracoastal Waterway
North Miami, Florida
1951 establishments in Florida